The Frederick Armbruster Cottage is a historic residence located in the Eliot neighborhood of Portland, Oregon, United States. Built in 1898, it is a locally-important example of the application of the Queen Anne style to simple housing for the European immigrant and working class families that flowed into the neighborhood during the 1880s to early 1900s. The German American Armbruster family operated a pretzel baking business from the back yard for nearly 30 years.

The house was inscribed on the National Register of Historic Places in 2001.

See also
National Register of Historic Places listings in Northeast Portland, Oregon

References

External links

, National Register of Historic Places cover documentation

Houses completed in 1898
1898 establishments in Oregon
Queen Anne architecture in Oregon
Houses on the National Register of Historic Places in Portland, Oregon
Eliot, Portland, Oregon
German-American culture in Portland, Oregon
Working-class culture in the United States
Northeast Portland, Oregon